Patrizia Lombardo (Rome, 3 September 1958) is an Italian former hurdler (100 m hs) and sprinter (400 m).

Biography
She was able to win 7 times the national championships in 4 different specialities. She has 41 caps in national team from 1976 to 1989.

National records
 100 metres hurdles: 13.10 ( Livorno, 30 May 1987) - holder until 9 July 1988

Achievements

National titles
3 wins in the 100 metres hurdles at the Italian Athletics Championships (1979, 1981, 1985)
1 win in the 200 metres at the Italian Athletics Championships (1979)
2 wins in the 60 metres hurdles at the Italian Athletics Indoor Championships (1980, 1987)
1 win in the 400 metres at the Italian Athletics Indoor Championships (1983)

See also
Italian all-time lists - 100 metres hurdles

References

External links
 

1958 births
Italian female hurdlers
Italian female sprinters
Living people
Athletes from Rome
Athletes (track and field) at the 1984 Summer Olympics
Olympic athletes of Italy
Mediterranean Games gold medalists for Italy
Mediterranean Games silver medalists for Italy
Mediterranean Games bronze medalists for Italy
Athletes (track and field) at the 1979 Mediterranean Games
Athletes (track and field) at the 1987 Mediterranean Games
Universiade medalists in athletics (track and field)
World Athletics Championships athletes for Italy
Mediterranean Games medalists in athletics
Universiade bronze medalists for Italy
Medalists at the 1981 Summer Universiade